Frederico Barrigana (28 April 1922 – 30 September 2007) was a Portuguese footballer who played as a goalkeeper.

He spent the vast majority of his career with Porto, where he earned the nickname "Mãos de Ferro" (Iron Hands) and appeared in 296 competitive matches. He was chosen by Portuguese sports newspaper Record as one of the best 100 Portuguese football players ever.

Club career
Born in Alcochete, Setúbal District, Barrigana started his senior career with Sporting CP, but did not play any games during his spell in Lisbon as he was barred by legendary João Azevedo. Afterwards, FC Porto's goalkeeper, Hungarian Bela Andrasik, mysteriously disappeared (it was later found out he was an anti-nazi spy who left the country in fear of António de Oliveira Salazar's regime); the club requested that Barrigana be loaned to them, and Sporting obliged.

Shortly after the arrival of Brazilian Dorival Yustrich, the 34-year-old Barrigana was deemed surplus to requirements and released. He then signed with S.C. Salgueiros of the Segunda Liga, retiring after two seasons.

International career
Barrigana made his debut for the Portugal national team on 21 March 1948, in a 2–0 friendly defeat against Spain in Madrid. Over six years, he won a further 11 caps.

Death
Barrigana died on 30 September 2007 in Águeda at the age of 85, after not being able to overcome a pulmonary infection.

References

Further reading
DIAS, Rui, Record – 100 Melhores do Futebol Português – Volume I, 2002, EDISPORT.

External links

1922 births
2007 deaths
People from Alcochete
Portuguese footballers
Association football goalkeepers
Primeira Liga players
Liga Portugal 2 players
Sporting CP footballers
FC Porto players
S.C. Salgueiros players
Académico de Viseu F.C. players
Portugal international footballers
Sportspeople from Setúbal District